Alpha is a city in Jackson County, Minnesota, United States. The population was 116 at the 2010 census.

History
Alpha was platted in 1895. A post office has been in operation at Alpha since 1895. The city was incorporated in 1899.

Geography

Demographics

2010 census
As of the census of 2010, there were 116 people, 47 households, and 38 families residing in the city. The racial makeup of the city was 94.0% White, 2.6% Asian, 0.9% from other races, and 2.6% from two or more races. Hispanic or Latino of any race were 0.9% of the population.

There were 47 households, of which 27.7% had children under the age of 18 living with them, 59.6% were married couples living together, 8.5% had a female householder with no husband present, 12.8% had a male householder with no wife present, and 19.1% were non-families. 19.1% of all households were made up of individuals, and 12.8% had someone living alone who was 65 years of age or older. The average household size was 2.47 and the average family size was 2.68.

The median age in the city was 43 years. 19.8% of residents were under the age of 18; 7.7% were between the ages of 18 and 24; 24.2% were from 25 to 44; 27.6% were from 45 to 64; and 20.7% were 65 years of age or older. The gender makeup of the city was 54.3% male and 45.7% female.

2000 census
As of the census of 2000, there were 126 people, 52 households, and 34 families residing in the city. The racial makeup of the city was 98.41% White and 1.59% Asian. Hispanic or Latino of any race were 0.79% of the population.

There were 52 households, out of which 28.8% had children under the age of 18 living with them, 59.6% were married couples living together, 3.8% had a female householder with no husband present, and 32.7% were non-families. 26.9% of all households were made up of individuals, and 13.5% had someone living alone who was 65 years of age or older. The average household size was 2.42 and the average family size was 2.91.

In the city, the population was spread out, with 24.6% under the age of 18, 6.3% from 18 to 24, 28.6% from 25 to 44, 23.8% from 45 to 64, and 16.7% who were 65 years of age or older. The median age was 38 years. For every 100 females, there were 93.8 males. For every 100 females age 18 and over, there were 102.1 males.

The median income for a household in the city was $41,750, and the median income for a family was $46,250. Males had a median income of $26,563 versus $17,000 for females. The per capita income for the city was $18,769. There were no families and 2.4% of the population living below the poverty line, including no under eighteens and 4.8% of those over 64.

Politics
Alpha is located in Minnesota's 1st congressional district, represented by Republican Jim Hagedorn.  At the state level, Alpha is located in Senate District 22, represented by Republican Doug Magnus, and in House District 22B, represented by Republican Rod Hamilton. Tim Cain is the mayor of Alpha.

References

External links
 Alpha Community Guide

Cities in Minnesota
Cities in Jackson County, Minnesota